The Yunusobod Line (Юнусобод йўли; ; Yunusabadskaya linaya) is the third line of the Tashkent Metro, opened in 2001. The line is 7.8 km long.

Timeline

Transfers

Name changes

Expansion plans
After its opening in August 2001, construction began on a northwards extension. However in 2003 all work was abandoned at 15% completion due to financial difficulties. In December 2016, construction work began again on the unfinished 2.9 km section of track between the Turkiston and Yunusobod stations. The two stations were designed to be accessible to people with disabilities such as wheelchair users. The estimated total cost of the project was 103.8 million USD.

References

See also

Tashkent Metro lines
Railway lines opened in 2001
2001 establishments in Uzbekistan